The 1970–71 snooker season was a series of snooker tournaments played between July 1970 and January 1971. The following table outlines the results for the season's events.


Calendar

Notes

References

1970
1970 in snooker
1971 in snooker